Japanese Hospital may refer to:

Japanese Hospital (Saipan), listed on the National Register of Historic Places in N. Mariana Islands
Japanese Hospital (Rota), listed on the National Register of Historic Places in N. Mariana Islands
Japanese Hospital (Los Angeles), a hospital established in Boyle Heights in 1929 to serve L.A.'s Japanese community